In mathematics, and particularly homology theory, Steenrod's Problem (named after mathematician Norman Steenrod) is a problem concerning the realisation of homology classes by singular manifolds.

Formulation
Let  be a closed, oriented manifold of dimension , and let  be its orientation class. Any continuous map  defines an induced homomorphism .

Results
Moreover, any cycle can be realized by the mapping of a pseudo-manifold.

The assumption that M be orientable can be relaxed.

Conclusions
For smooth manifolds M the problem reduces to finding the form of the homomorphism , where  is the oriented bordism group of X. The connection between the bordism groups   and the Thom spaces MSO(k) clarified the Steenrod problem by reducing it to the study of the homomorphisms . In his landmark paper from 1954, René Thom produced an example of a non-realisable class, where M is the Eilenberg–MacLane space .

See also
 Singular homology
 Pontryagin-Thom construction
 Cobordism

References

External links
Thom construction and the Steenrod problem on MathOverflow
Explanation for the Pontryagin-Thom construction

Homology theory
Manifolds
Geometric topology